Ganesh is a male given name commonly used in India and the Indian diaspora. The name is a form of Ganesha, a widely worshipped deity in the Hindu pantheon.

Ganesh (actor), Kannada language film actor
Ganesh Asirvatham, English language teacher from Klang, Selangor
Ganesh Baba, yogi and teacher in the tradition of Kriya Yoga
Ganesh Chand, Fijian academic and former politician of Indian descent
Ganesh Dutt KCSI, KCIE (1868–1943), Indian freedom fighter, administrator and educationist
Ganesh Ghosh (1900–1994), Indian Bengali freedom fighter, revolutionary and politician
Ganesh Hegde (born 1974), Indian singer and Bollywood choreographer, from Karnataka
Ganesh Man Singh, commander of Nepalese democratic movement of 1990 AD
Ganesh Mavlankar (died 1956), Indian politician
Ganesh Mylvaganam (born 1966), former United Arab Emirates cricketer
Ganesh Naik, Indian politician
Ganesh Patro, film writer
Ganesh Prasad Singh (born 1947), member of the 14th Lok Sabha of India
Ganesh Pyne, renowned Calcutta born Indian painter
Ganesh Satish (born 1988), Indian cricketer
Ganesh Shah (born 1949), Nepalese politician and Minister of Environment, Science and Technology
Ganesh Shankar Vidyarthi (1890–1931), fighter against oppression and injustice
Ganesh Singh (born 1962), a member of the 14th Lok Sabha of India
Ganesh Sittampalam, the youngest person to pass an A-level in 1988 at 9 yrs 4 months old
Ganesh Thapa, the present President of the All Nepal Football Association (ANFA)
Ganesh Vasudeo Joshi, social activist and elderly guiding philosopher in the Indian freedom struggle
Ganesh Venkatraman, a Tamil language actor

Indian masculine given names